Aquadulcaris is a genus of crustaceans in the family Paramelitidae, containing the following species:
Aquadulcaris andronyx (Stewart & Griffiths, 1992)
Aquadulcaris auricularius (K. H. Barnard, 1916)
Aquadulcaris crassicornis (K. H. Barnard, 1916)
Aquadulcaris dentata (Stewart & Griffiths, 1992)
Aquadulcaris marunuguis (Stewart & Griffiths, 1992)
Aquadulcaris pheronyx (Stewart & Griffiths, 1992)

References

Gammaridea
Taxonomy articles created by Polbot